Edmund Edwards (6 January 1910 – 18 August 1990) was an Australian cricketer. He played two first-class matches for Western Australia in 1948/49.

References

External links
 

1910 births
1990 deaths
Australian cricketers
Western Australia cricketers
Cricketers from Perth, Western Australia